Reasons to Hang Around is the fourth album of Norwegian band Minor Majority, released in 2006. All the songs on the album are written by Pål Angelskår, except "Don't Say You Love Me" & "Keep Coming Around", written by Pål Angelskår, Hein Goemans, and Jon Arild Stieng, and "There Will Come Another", written by Kevin Clarke and Gregory Wicky.

Track listing
Wish You'd Hold That Smile
Don't Say You Love Me
Come Back To Me
As Good As It Gets
There Will Come Another
Alison
You Were Saying
Let The Night Begin
Supergirl
Keep Coming Around
No Particular Girl
The Long Way Home
What You Do To Me

Singles
2006: "Come Back to Me" (#19 in VG-lista)
2006: "Supergirl" (#20 in VG-lista)

2006 albums
Minor Majority albums